WJSB (1050 AM) is a radio station broadcasting a country music format, simulcasting WAAZ-FM (104.7). Licensed to Crestview, Florida, United States, the station serves the Fort Walton Beach area. The station is currently owned by Crestview Broadcasting Co., Inc. and features programming from CBS News Radio.

References

External links

JSB
Country radio stations in the United States
Radio stations established in 1954
1954 establishments in Florida
JSB